Kerry Butler is an American actress and singer known primarily for her work in theatre. She is best known for originating the roles of Barbara Maitland in Beetlejuice, Penny Pingleton in Hairspray, and Clio/Kira in Xanadu, the latter of which earned her a Tony Award nomination for Best Performance by a Leading Actress in a Musical.

Early life
Born in the Bensonhurst neighborhood of Brooklyn, Butler began acting in commercials at the age of three. She notes that growing up, "When I saw Annie ... I knew that was what I wanted to do." After a four-year hiatus imposed by her mother, Kerry started acting again at the age of nine and has been at it since.

Butler graduated from Ithaca College in 1992, with a Bachelor of Fine Arts degree in musical theatre.

Career

Butler toured with the musical Oklahoma! in Europe in the role of Ado Annie. Other New York roles included Vicki in the workshop of Bright Lights, Big City, Barrow in The "I" Word and Claudia in The Folsom Head. She also has done work on various commercials.

Butler made her Broadway debut in 1993 in the role of Ms. Jones in the musical Blood Brothers, where she also understudied the role of Linda. In 1995, Butler originated the role of Belle for the Toronto production of Disney's Beauty and the Beast, and she was nominated for a Dora Award for her performance. Butler eventually transferred to Broadway as Belle, and, after playing the role for over two years, she left the musical in September 1997 and was replaced by Debbie Gibson. She then moved over to Les Misérables to play Eponine.

In 2001 Butler played the love interest Shelley in the acclaimed Off-Broadway original musical Bat Boy: The Musical. Though the show had a "fanatical following", Butler noted that "We were really building an audience before Sept. 11. And after that we never recovered. People didn't want to go out at all, let alone downtown." Bat Boy closed in December 2001.

Hairspray
In February 2002, Butler was cast as Penny Pingleton (a role she had originated in workshops) in Hairspray, the musical version of the John Waters 1988 film of the same name. After an out-of-town tryout in Seattle, Hairspray opened on Broadway in August 2002 and "became an immediate Broadway smash." Even in a star-studded ensemble cast, reviewers singled Butler out for her sparkling performance as the wacky best friend. The show won eight Tony Awards including Best Musical. For her performance, Butler was nominated for Drama Desk and Outer Critics Circle Awards and received the Clarence Derwent Award.

While Hairspray went into pre-production, Butler played the free-spirited performance artist Maddie in the limited run of the intimate Australian musical Prodigal at the York Theatre. In March 2002 Butler also appeared on the TV show Sesame Street as Ms. Camp, a letter carrier. During her run in Hairspray, Butler filmed a TV pilot for Fox entitled Twins, but it was not picked up for the season.

After starring in Hairspray for a year, Butler left the cast in July 2003 and was succeeded by Jenn Gambatese.

Little Shop of Horrors and beyond

Following the end of her Hairspray contract, Butler was cast as Audrey in the Broadway revival production of the musical Little Shop of Horrors. Butler revisited her long-lost childhood Brooklyn accent to play Audrey, the love interest with a sadistic dentist boyfriend and a heart of gold. A fan of Little Shop composer Alan Menken, who also wrote the music for Beauty and the Beast, Butler received an Outer Critics Circle nomination for her performance.

After leaving the show in the summer of 2004, Butler traveled to San Francisco where she created the role of scheming, foul-mouthed teenager Dedee Truitt in the new musical The Opposite of Sex, which had its world premiere at the Magic Theatre that fall. The musical is based on Don Roos' 1998 film starring Christina Ricci and Lisa Kudrow.

In the fall of 2005, Butler appeared in the original Off-Broadway musical Miracle Brothers at the Vineyard Theatre. She played Isabel, a mother made miserable by the rebelliousness of her son as well as her unhappy marriage. In the summer of 2006, Butler reprised her role of Dedee in The Opposite of Sex at the Williamstown Theatre Festival and followed that by taking on the role of Kate, the Ayn Rand-loving runaway bride, in the New York Musical Theatre Festival production of Party Come Here.

Butler also portrayed the manipulative heiress and recovering alcoholic Claudia Reston on the ABC soap opera One Life to Live from January 2006 until January 2007, when her character was written off the show.

Xanadu
From May 2007 through September 2008, Butler returned to the Broadway stage to star in the new musical Xanadu, based on the 1980 roller-disco film starring Olivia Newton-John. She played the dual role of Clio/Kira, a Greek muse who inspires and falls in love with a struggling artist. Butler mastered roller skating for the role and spent nearly the duration of the show on skates. Widely expected to be a flop, the musical opened in July 2007 to extensive critical acclaim and was the surprise hit of the summer.

For her role in Xanadu, Butler was nominated for the Tony Award for Best Performance by a Leading Actress in a Musical and the Drama League Award for Distinguished Performance.

In February and March 2008, Butler appeared as Reese, the thieving assistant to a fashion designer, in the first season of the television series Lipstick Jungle on NBC.

Faith, Trust & Pixie Dust
In May 2008, Butler released her first solo album on the PS Classics label. The album is entitled Faith, Trust & Pixie Dust and features some of Butler's favorite songs from Disney films and shows given "intimate, acoustic" arrangements. The title is taken from the lyrics of the Jonatha Brooke song "I'll Try", from the film Return to Neverland, which is featured on the album. Of note is the track "This Only Happens in the Movies", an unreleased song written by Alan Menken (for the unrealized prequel to Who Framed Roger Rabbit), being given its inaugural recording. The full track listing is below.

In a unique contest sponsored by her official site, Butler let fans submit suggestions for one song to be included on the album, with the winner, chosen by Butler, joining her in the studio when the song was recorded. The winning entry was "God Help the Outcasts", from the animated film The Hunchback of Notre Dame.

Catch Me If You Can, Rock of Ages
The following year, Butler was again featured as a guest star on major television shows. In May 2009 she appeared on an episode of NBC's 30 Rock, as a member of a group of New York ladies of leisure with a surprising secret. The following month, she appeared on the ABC series Cupid, as Debbie, a working-class masseuse who attempts to improve herself to impress her wealthy boyfriend.

In the summer of 2009, Butler appeared in the world premiere of Catch Me If You Can at the 5th Avenue Theatre, the same venue where Hairspray had its pre-Broadway tryout. She played Brenda Strong, the Southern ingénue who falls in love with the con artist Frank Abagnale, Jr. (The role was played by Amy Adams in the Steven Spielberg film version of Catch Me If You Can.)

In September 2009, Butler began a six-month engagement in the Broadway musical Rock of Ages, playing six performances a week. She played the lead role of Sherrie, a small-town girl who moves to the Sunset Strip in Los Angeles to pursue her dream of becoming an actress. Butler left the production on March 13, 2010.

In April 2010, Butler made her New York City cabaret debut at Feinstein's at the Regency with a show of songs she has performed on Broadway as well as personal favorites.

In October 2010, Butler starred in the New York Musical Theatre Festival production of Pandora's Box, playing the title role of Pandora, a slightly naive suburban housewife whose life is turned upside down by the arrival of a mysterious stranger. She also appeared as Mary Jo Clarkson, an Islamist terrorist, on the CBS television show Blue Bloods.

From March to September 2011, Butler reprised the role of Brenda Strong in the Broadway production of Catch Me if You Can at the Neil Simon Theatre, the same Broadway theatre where Hairspray played. For this role she was nominated for the Drama Desk Award for Outstanding Featured Actress in a Musical.

Also in September 2011, Butler appeared on the series finale of FX's Rescue Me as an overprotective mother who argues with Denis Leary's character on a playground.

The Best Man, The Call, Under My Skin

From March through September 2012, Butler appeared in the Broadway revival of Gore Vidal's The Best Man. She played Mabel Cantwell, the Southern wife of a presidential candidate. The production costarred Angela Lansbury, James Earl Jones, Candice Bergen, Eric McCormack, John Larroquette, Michael McKean, and Jefferson Mays. It was her first Broadway role in a drama, rather than a musical.

On February 18, 2013, Butler played Evelyn Nesbit in a concert production of Ragtime at Avery Fisher Hall. Also that month, she appeared on an episode of White Collar, playing a skeptical art dealer.

From March through May 2013, Butler appeared Off-Broadway in The Call, a new play by Tanya Barfield, a co-production between Playwrights Horizons and Primary Stages. In it, Butler played Annie, an urban artist who decides to adopt a baby from Africa. The play was very personal to Butler.

In May 2013, Butler appeared on an episode of Law and Order: SVU as Ariel Randolph, a mother with a secret life whose bad decisions have tragic consequences.

From April to June 2014, Butler appeared Off-Broadway in Under My Skin, a comedy by Robert Sternin and Prudence Fraser (of The Nanny fame). She played Melody Dent, a temp at a health insurance company who, thanks to a freak accident and divine intervention, ends up switching bodies with the male CEO of the company.

Return to musical theatre; additional television appearances
In October 2014, Butler starred in the York Theatre Company production of Big alongside John Tartaglia. She played Susan Lawrence, who works at a toy company and becomes the love interest of the main character.

In December 2014, Butler appeared on The Mysteries of Laura as a protective mother and on Elementary as a birdwatcher.

From March through June 2015, Butler appeared Off-Broadway at New World Stages in Clinton: The Musical, a satirical look at the years of Bill Clinton's presidency. She played Hillary Clinton and received good reviews for her role.

In April 2015, Butler lent her vocal talents to the animated children's program Wallykazam!, voicing the character of Nancy the Noodle.

In October 2015, Butler made her solo debut at Feinstein's/54 Below with Seth Rudetsky on piano, performing hits from her career as well as telling behind-the-scenes stories.

In November 2015, Butler appeared on The Mindy Project as Jody's sister-in-law (and sometime mistress) Ann Marie.

Butler appears in the Netflix television mini-series Gilmore Girls: A Year in the Life, which was released in November 2016. She plays Claudia, therapist to Lorelai and Emily Gilmore.

Disaster!, Mean Girls
From February to May 2016, Butler appeared on Broadway in Disaster!, by Seth Rudetsky and Jack Plotnick, a parody of 1970s disaster movies featuring hit songs from that decade. She played Marianne, a career-oriented reporter who, while investigating the story of a poorly constructed casino ship, runs into an unexpected person from her past. The reviews for the show were generally favorable, especially from The New York Times, which listed the show as a Critic's Pick. However, due to poor ticket sales, the show closed on May 8, 2016.

From October to December 2017, Butler appeared in the Broadway-bound musical adaptation of Mean Girls, by Tina Fey, Jeff Richmond, and Nell Benjamin. The show had an out-of-town tryout at the National Theatre in Washington, D.C. Butler played the roles of Ms. Norbury (played by Tina Fey in the film), Mrs. Heron, and Mrs. George.

From March to September 2018, Butler played the roles of Ms. Norbury, Mrs. Heron, and Mrs. George in Mean Girls on Broadway. Butler played her final performance on September 9 and was replaced by Jennifer Simard.

Reviews took note of her standout performance in the three very different roles. The Hollywood Reporter noted her role as "...stand-in from the movie, sardonic math teacher Ms. Norbury, played here by Kerry Butler, acing triple-duty with distinctive takes also on Cady's earnest mother and Regina's self-described 'cool mom'". Variety wrote, in reviewing the Washington, D.C., production: "Kerry Butler offers delightful turns as the teacher, Mrs. Norbury, precisely mimicking Fey's role in the film, along with a hysterical portrayal of Regina's developmentally arrested mother (Amy Poehler in the film). The latter includes a delicious parody of 'Saturday Night Live's' iconic skit, 'The Californians.'"

Beetlejuice, directorial debut
From October to November 2018, Butler appeared in the world premiere of the musical Beetlejuice at the National Theatre in Washington, D.C., in the role of Barbara Maitland. Barbara is a woman of simple pleasures and, along with her husband, Adam, also a recently deceased ghost who finds herself haunting her own house, newly occupied by the living Deetz family, as well as contending with the trickster ghost Beetlejuice.

Butler reprised the role of Barbara Maitland in the Broadway production of the show from March 2019 until its closing in March 2020. She is one of the original cast members who returned to Beetlejuice when it returned to Broadway in April 2022.

In October 2023, Butler will be making her directorial by helming a production of Newsies at Rise Above Performing Arts in Sarasota, Florida.

Personal life
Butler continues to perform in various workshops, readings, and benefit concerts. She is a vegetarian and activist whose concerns include youth mentoring, human rights violations, genocide, and environmental issues.

Butler is married to childhood friend Muppet writer and puppeteer Joey Mazzarino, and they have two daughters, whom they adopted from Ethiopia. Their older daughter, Segi, is the inspiration for the Sesame Street song I Love My Hair. Their second daughter's name is Sumaya.

Credits

Theatre

Film

Television

Video games

Demos, readings, concerts, and workshops
 A Very Brady Musical
 Broadway Vacation
 Seeing Red
 Beetlejuice
 The Best Little Whorehouse in Texas
 Hazel
 Clinton: The Musical
 Big
 Ragtime
 Cinderella
 Through the Door
 Romy and Michele's High School Reunion
 The Dogs of Pripyat
 The Green Heart
 Hollywood Lies
 The Nutty Professor
 The Front
 Catch Me If You Can
 Baby
 Xanadu
 One Step Forward
 In Your Dreams
 The Little Mermaid
 Pandora's Box
 The Man in the White Suit
 Legally Blonde: The Musical
 The Wedding Singer
 Easter Rising
 Robber Bridegroom
 Piece
 Taboo
 Bright Lights, Big City
 Le Passe Muraille (later named Amour)

Cast recordings
 Bat Boy - Original Off-Broadway Cast, 2001
 Prodigal - Original Off-Broadway Cast, 2003
 Hairspray - Original Broadway Cast, 2003
 Little Shop of Horrors - New Broadway Cast, 2004
 Anna Karenina - The Broadway Musical, 2007
 Xanadu - Original Broadway Cast, 2007
 Dear Edwina - World Premiere Cast, 2008
 Catch Me If You Can - Original Broadway Cast, 2011
 Clinton: The Musical - Original Off-Broadway Cast, 2015
 Disaster! - Original Broadway Cast, 2016
 Mean Girls: The Musical - Original Broadway Cast, 2018
 Beetlejuice - Original Broadway Cast, 2019

Solo album
 Faith, Trust & Pixie Dust - Released on May 13, 2008

Track Listing:

"This Only Happens in the Movies"
"When You Wish Upon a Star"
"I'll Try"
"Call Me a Princess"
"Colors of the Wind"
"It's a Small World"/"God Help the Outcasts"
"Baby Mine"
"Minnie's Yoo Hoo"
"Second Star to the Right"
"The Bare Necessities"
"When She Loved Me"
"Disneyland"

Other recordings
 Featured on Sleep Well Tonight: Lullabies for Little Dreamers - "Sleep Safe Tonight"; "Hush Little Baby"; "All The World Is Sleeping"; "Lambs Are Sleeping", duet with Kaitlin Hopkins; Meet Me On The Other Side; Moon Sun, 2002
 Featured on Jamie deRoy & Friends: Volume 4: Family - "The Portrait", 2002
 Featured on Jamie deRoy & Friends: Volume 5: Animal Tracks - "Lion Tamer", 2003
 Featured on Jamie deRoy & Friends: Volume 6: When I Grow Up - "Some Shoes Are Harder Than Others to Fill", 2005
 Featured on NEO: New, Emerging, Outstanding - "Any Day", duet with Laura Bell Bundy and "Inside Your Heart", duet with Deven May, 2005
 Featured on Guy Haines' New Guy in Town - "Sure Thing", duet with Guy Haines, 2005
 Featured on The Broadway Musicals of 1945 - "Here I Go Again", duet with Eddie Korbich; "It Doesn't Cost Anything to Dream"; "Slightly Perfect", duet with Scott Ailing; "What's the Use of Wond'rin", duet with Marc Kudisch, 2007
 Featured on Carols for a Cure: Volume 9 - "Away in a Manger", 2007
 Featured on Ballroom Remixed - "Bad at Being Good", 2011
 Featured on Out of Our Heads: The Music of Kooman and Dimond - "I Think That He Likes Me", 2011
 Featured on Album by Joe Iconis - "The Saddest Girl in the World," 2022

Awards and nominations

References

External links 

 
  (archive)
 
 

Actresses from New York City
Musicians from Brooklyn
American women singers
American film actresses
American musical theatre actresses
American stage actresses
American soap opera actresses
American television actresses
American voice actresses
Ithaca College alumni
Living people
21st-century American women
1971 births